Tony David Jeffries (born 2 March 1985) is an English former professional boxer who won a bronze medal in the 2008 Summer Olympics. In 2012, an undefeated Jeffries was forced to retire due to hand injuries.

Life and career
Jeffries was born in Sunderland, Tyne and Wear and grew up around the East Herrington area of the city whilst attending Farringdon Community Sports College. He began to box at the age of ten, inspired by his uncle William Young "Billy" Bryce, a former professional boxer. He joined Sunderland Amateur Boxing Club, and in 1999 won the School Boys' Championships, gold in the European Cadets (U17) in 2001  and won the juniors of the 2003 YMCA International Cup in New Delhi. He was also a semifinalist in the 2003 Junior Brandenburg Cup and 2003 European Junior Championships in Warsaw.

He has won nine National titles and fought for England/Great Britain 56 times, having a total of 106 fights (96 amateur & 10 professional).

On 18 November 2011, Jeffries married his childhood sweetheart. The couple has three daughters. In January 2012, they both moved to Santa Monica, California.

He has two sisters. 

At the 2005 Commonwealth Championships he lost in the finals to Shawn Cox of Barbados, and in the quarterfinals of the 2006 Commonwealth Games he lost to Scotland's tourney winner Kenny Anderson at light-heavy (had right hand surgery after). In other open international competitions, he was a finalist in Kaunas Lithuania's 2005 Szocikas Tournament and Finland's 2005 GeeBee tournament and Bulgaria's 2006 Strandja Memorial.

At the 2007 World Amateur Boxing Championships he beat Daniel Kooij, Christopher Downs and Ramazan Magomedov in the preliminaries, but lost to Kazakhstan southpaw Yerkebuian Shynaliyev in the quarters. He did, however, qualify for the 2008 Olympics, becoming the first ever boxer from Tyne and Wear to do so. He won a bronze medal after losing to the Irish Boxer Kenny Egan in the semi-final round. Not long after, he presented his medal to the Sunderland people at the Stadium of Light, being a supporter of Sunderland A.F.C. Jeffries signed his first professional contract during the half-time break of Sunderland's match against the Bolton Wanderers on Saturday 29 November, after a row over unpaid bonuses from the Amateur Boxing Association of England.

On 23 September 2012, Tony Jeffries announced on Facebook that he has retired. The numerous issues with his hands and unsuccessful surgery and treatment left him with no choice but to retire. Tony now owns and works at Box 'N Burn boxing gym in Santa Monica, Los Angeles, with Kentucky fitness expert Kevan Watson.

World Amateur Championships results
2007 (as a Light heavyweight)
Defeated Daniel Kooij (Netherlands) 13–6
Defeated Christopher Downs (United States) 18–9
Defeated Ramazan Magomedov (Belarus) 16–8
Lost to Yerkabulan Shinaliev (Kazakhstan) 9–20

Olympic Games results
2008 (as a Light heavyweight)
1st round bye
Defeated Eleider Álvarez (Colombia) 5–5
Defeated Imre Szellő (Hungary) 10–2
Lost to Kenneth Egan (Ireland) 3–10

Pro Record

Professional career
Jeffries signed a professional contract with boxing promoter Frank Maloney in January 2009. On 27 February, Jeffries won his debut fight at super middleweight on the Munroe-Martinez undercard in a first-round knockout of Aliaksandr Vaiavoda in Barnsley.

Jeffries won his second professional fight on home soil in impressive fashion. He produced another TKO at the Crowtree Leisure Centre to defeat Roy Meissner.

Jeffries racked up five more wins before a disappointing draw with Michael Banbula in July 2010 due to a mix up in rounds, Jeffries thinking he was going into a 6-round fight but after the 6 rounds he got told he had 2 rounds left and lost the last 2 rounds and ended up drawing the fight.

Professional boxing record

Retirement

Jefferies retired from boxing after his hands failed to heal following surgery attemping to address his long-term struggle with hand issues in 2012. Following his retirement, he moved to Los Angeles where he waited anticipating this healing process. Tony Jeffries started to work in a gym in Santa Monica where he met another trainer who is from Kentucky. Jefferies and his fellow trainer left this gym and started a boxing Bootcamp in Santa Monica which received investment from actor Mickey Rourke. The terms of the premises where changed by Mickey Rourke, contrary to what Jeffries and the other trainer originally agreed upon so they went separate ways. The Santa Monica Bootcamp got voted Los Angeles' number 1 gym in 2013 on Yelp and the gym Box 'N Burn was successful after just a year of opening in 2014.  Jeffries and the other trainer opened Box 'N Burn's second location in Brentwood, Los Angeles. Alongside his ventures in boxing, Jefferies played a role in  NBC TV's Blacklist in 2013 and was one of the figures in Levi's world campaign in the same year. His Levi's modelling pictures were on billboards across the world. Tony was also the head trainer for MMA fighter Brendan Schaub, cornering him for his bouts against Matt Mitrione, and  Travis Browne, which ultimately led to Schaub's retirement. He has also featured in the video for Cannonball (Skylar Grey song). In June of 2022, Jeffries also starred in a Dhar Mann video.

References

External links
 
 Official website
 Blog
 Bio
 2007 World Championships
Box 'N Burn

Light-heavyweight boxers
English male boxers
Olympic boxers of Great Britain
Boxers at the 2006 Commonwealth Games
Boxers at the 2008 Summer Olympics
Olympic bronze medallists for Great Britain
Sportspeople from Sunderland
1985 births
Living people
Olympic medalists in boxing
English Olympic medallists
Medalists at the 2008 Summer Olympics
Commonwealth Games competitors for England